Mirshahin Agayev Dilaver oglu (born 1963 in Yardimli, Azerbaijan) also known as simply Mir Shahin is a journalist and reporter during the Nagorno-Karabakh conflict. He's now the Vice President for Production of ANS Group of Companies and Executive Producer of ANS Independent Broadcasting Media Company. He also used to be the General Director of ANS ChM Radio Broadcasting Company. Agayev is co-founder of several firms under ANS Group of Companies which include ANS Independent Broadcasting Media Company, ANS Chm Radio Broadcasting Company, ANS Commerce, ANS-PRESS Publishing Company.

From 1992 through 2005, Agayev held a position of Chief Editor at ANS Independent Broadcasting Media Company. Mirshahin is known for his reports from frontlines during the First Nagorno-Karabakh War. Agayev also holds the title of Honored Journalist of the Republic.

See also
ANS Group of Companies
Chingiz Mustafayev
Osman Mirzayev

References

Azerbaijani journalists
People from Yardimli District
1963 births
Living people
Azerbaijani television personalities